Pathlawa is a  village near Banga in the Shahid Bhagat Singh Nagar district, Punjab state, India. According to the 2001 Census, Pathlawa has a population of 2,364 people. Neighbouring villages include Moranwali, and Ladhana Ucha.

References 

Villages in Shaheed Bhagat Singh Nagar district